Machomyrma is a genus of ants in the subfamily Myrmicinae containing the single species Machomyrma dispar. The genus is known only from Australia, where the ants are rarely encountered. Colonies nest is soil or between rocks in habitats ranging from savanna to rainforest. Little is known about their biology.

References

External links

Myrmicinae
Monotypic ant genera
Hymenoptera of Australia